Frans Julius Möller (19 May 1886 – 10 October 1954) was a Swedish tennis player who competed in the 1912 Summer Olympics. He was eliminated in the second round of the outdoor singles, and lost in the first round of the indoor singles, outdoor doubles and indoor mixed doubles.

References

1886 births
1954 deaths
Swedish male tennis players
Olympic tennis players of Sweden
Tennis players at the 1912 Summer Olympics
Tennis players from Stockholm